Dallas Paul Kephart (born ) is American politician and attorney who currently represents the 73rd District in the Pennsylvania House of Representatives as a Republican since 2023.

Early life
Kephart was born in Pennsylvania and grew up in Decatur Township in Clearfield County. He graduated from Phillipsburg-Osceola High School in 2014.  Kephart earned a Bachelor of Arts degree in political science from Lock Haven University of Pennsylvania in 2018, graduating magna cum laude. 

While earning his undergraduate degree, Kephart interned for Congressman Glenn Thompson and worked as a coal miner during the summer months. While earning his Juris Doctor at Penn State Dickinson Law, Kephart clerked for the  U.S. House Oversight Committee. He finished law school in 2018, and subsequently became a licensed attorney in Pennsylvania, working for a judge on the Commonwealth Court of Pennsylvania.

Political career
In 2022, Kephart won the three-way Republican primary to represent the 73rd District in the Pennsylvania House of Representatives.  The seat was open following the retirement of Tommy Sankey, and Kephart faced no opponent in the general election.

Electoral history

References

Living people
Republican Party members of the Pennsylvania House of Representatives
21st-century American politicians
Year of birth uncertain
Lock Haven University of Pennsylvania alumni
Dickinson School of Law alumni
People from Clearfield County, Pennsylvania